Troy Henry (born 23 November 1987), known professionally as TroyBoi, is a British DJ, record producer, and musician.

His music combines elements of trap, house, bass, future bass, vogue, and dubstep. His debut album Left is Right was released in 2017, followed by the extended plays, V!bez, Vol. 2 (2018) and V!bez, Vol. 4 (2021).

Early life
Troy Henry was born in South London, England on 23 November 1987 to Indian mother Connie Henry and his father.

Musical style and influences
TroyBoi's music has been categorised as trap, house, bass, future bass, vogue, and dubstep.

Discography

Studio albums

Extended plays

Singles
Adapted from Apple Music.

As lead artist

As featured artist

Production discography

References

External links
 

1988 births
British record producers
British people of Indian descent
Living people
Mad Decent artists
Monstercat artists
Owsla artists